Edwin Nadason Thumboo B.B.M. (born 22 November 1933) is a Singaporean poet and academic who is regarded as one of the pioneers of English literature in Singapore.

Thumboo graduated in English from the University of Malaya in 1956. Although he applied for a position at the university, he was rejected as few locals held academic posts at that time. He therefore worked in the civil service for about nine years before finally joining the university, then renamed the University of Singapore, in 1966 following Singapore's independence. He received a Ph.D. from the university in 1970. Thumboo rose to the position of full professor in the Department of English Language and Literature, heading the department between 1977 and 1993. After the merger of the University of Singapore and Nanyang University in 1980 to form the National University of Singapore (NUS), he was the Dean of the Faculty of Arts and Social Sciences from 1980 to 1991, NUS's longest-serving dean of the Faculty of Arts and Social Sciences. Thumboo was the first Chairman and Director of the university's Centre for the Arts from 1993 to 2005, and continues to be associated with the university as an emeritus professor, a position he has held since retiring from full-time teaching in September 1997.

Thumboo's poetry is inspired by myth and history, and he is often dubbed Singapore's unofficial poet laureate because of his poems with nationalistic themes. A pioneer of local English literature, he compiled and edited some of the first anthologies of English poetry and fiction from Singapore and Malaysia. His own collections of poetry include Rib of Earth (1956), Ulysses by the Merlion (1979) and A Third Map (1993). His latest anthology Still Travelling, consisting of almost 50 poems, was published in 2008. Thumboo has won the National Book Development Council of Singapore Book Awards for Poetry three times, in 1978, 1980 and 1994. He has also received the inaugural S.E.A. Write Award (1979), the first Cultural Medallion for Literature (1979), the Association of Southeast Asian Nations (ASEAN) Cultural and Communication Award (Literature) (1987), and the Raja Rao Award (2002). He was conferred a Bintang Bakti Masyarakat (Public Service Star) in 1981 with an additional Bar in 1991, and the Pingat Jasa Gemilang (Meritorious Services Medal) in 2006. He conceived the first National Poetry Festival for Singapore in 2015.

Early years
Edwin Thumboo, born in Singapore on 22 November 1933, was the eldest of eight children of a Tamil Indian schoolteacher and a Teochew-Peranakan Chinese housewife from a Singaporean merchant family. He and his siblings grew up speaking English and Teochew. The family was financially comfortable; their home in Mandai was the only one in the neighbourhood with electricity. Because of his mixed parentage, as a child he was sometimes called names and marginalized. This was said to have fostered determination and self-respect in him. He completed his primary education at Pasir Panjang Primary School in 1940. During the Japanese occupation of Singapore (1942–1945), he helped his family by selling cakes, tending goats, and working as a salesboy. Following the war, he studied at Monk's Hill Secondary School (finishing there in 1946) and Victoria School (1948). It was at the latter place that he began writing poetry at the age of 17 years, encouraged by the senior English master Shamus Frazer. Thumboo considers Frazer his spiritual father, and later dedicated Rib of Earth (1956), his first collection of poetry published while an undergraduate, to him. At this time, Thumboo was also a member of the Youth Poetry Circle, which counted among its members other early literary pioneers of Singapore such as Goh Sin Tub and Lim Thean Soo.

Education and career

Thumboo majored in English literature and history at the University of Malaya. As a freshman, he was a member of the editorial board of Fajar (Dawn in Malay), a radical leftist journal published by the University Socialist Club. The seventh issue of Fajar which appeared in May 1954 contained an editorial entitled "Aggression in Asia" which advocated independence from the United Kingdom. Three days later, Chinese middle school students clashed with the police. As a result, after two weeks Thumboo was arrested by the British colonial government together with seven other students and put on trial for sedition. Former Prime Minister Lee Kuan Yew, who was the Club's legal adviser and a Fajar subscriber, arranged for British Queen's Counsel D. N. Pritt to act in their defence, with Lee himself as junior counsel. The students were acquitted of the charge by District Judge F. A. Chua.

Thumboo graduated with a Bachelor of Arts with honours (B.A. (Hons.)) in English from the University of Malaya in 1956. Hoping to teach and pursue a further degree, he applied for a position at the university but was rejected as few locals held academic posts at that time. He therefore entered the civil service, working for the Income Tax Department (1957–1961), Central Provident Fund Board (1961–1965), and the Singapore Telephone Board (1965–1966) where he was an assistant secretary. In 1966, the year following Singapore's independence, he joined the University of Singapore as an assistant lecturer. Conducting doctoral research into African poetry in English, he received his Ph.D. from the university in 1970. He became a full professor in the Department of English Language and Literature, heading the department between 1977 and 1993. The University of Singapore and Nanyang University merged in 1980 to form the National University of Singapore (NUS), and he was the Dean of the Faculty of Arts and Social Sciences from 1980 to 1991, NUS's longest-serving dean of the Faculty of Arts and Social Sciences.

As an academic, he taught Elizabethan and Jacobean drama, the Romantic poets, Malaysian and Singaporean literatures, and creative writing, among other subjects. His research interests included the modern novel (E. M. Forster, D. H. Lawrence and Joseph Conrad) and the novels of Empire (such as Rudyard Kipling), Commonwealth literature (including Botswana writer Bessie Head), and William Shakespeare's Roman plays. When he headed the English Department, it introduced the study of Commonwealth/New Literatures in English, and of English language as a major so that graduates would be better equipped to teach English in schools and junior colleges. Thumboo was appointed a Professorial Fellow by NUS in 1995 and continues to be associated with the university as an emeritus professor, a position he has held since he retired from full-time teaching in September 1997. He served as the first Chairman and Director of the university's Centre for the Arts from 1993 to 2005.

Thumboo also held visiting professorships and fellowships at universities in Australia, the UK and the US. He was Fulbright-Hayes Visiting Professor at Pennsylvania State University (1979–1980); Chairman of the Association for Commonwealth Literature and Language Studies, VII Triennium (1983–1986); Writer-in-Residence at the Institute of Culture and Communication, Hawaii (1985); Ida Beam Professor at the University of Iowa in 1986; a member of the International Advisory Panel at the East-West Centre, Hawaii (1987); Honorary Research Fellow at University College, University of London (1987); a member of the Committee of Jurors for the Neustadt International Prize for Literature in Oklahoma, USA (1988); CAS–Miller Visiting Professor at the University of Illinois at Urbana-Champaign (1998), Visiting Professor and Writer-in-Residence at University of Wollongong in New South Wales (1989); and Visiting Fellow at the Department of English, Australian Defence Force Academy (1993). In 1991, Thumboo worked with the Ministry of Education to help establish the Creative Arts Programme for secondary school and junior college students in Singapore. He continues to mentor young poets under the programme.

Poetry and influence

In the 1950s, Thumboo wrote mostly lyrical poetry based on personal experiences. Displaying the influence of the English literary tradition on him, they dealt with aesthetic and metaphysical themes. By the mid-1970s, he had shifted his focus to the public sphere, believing that poets of post-independence Singapore should work towards creating a national literature. Singapore's national life was a key subject of his collection of poetry Gods Can Die (1977), and it has been said that the subsequent anthologies Ulysses by the Merlion (1979) and A Third Map (1993) "established his reputation as a national poet committed to articulating a cultural vision for a multicultural Singapore". Thumboo is often dubbed Singapore's unofficial poet laureate because of his poems with nationalistic themes, notably 9 August – II (1977), and Ulysses by the Merlion (1979) which was published in the anthology of the same name, as well as his role in promoting Singapore literature, for example, through his work as General Editor of the literary journal Singa. Ulysses, which references an iconic statue of a beast with the upper body of a lion and the tail of a fish called the Merlion that faces Marina Bay, was inspired by the use of Irish mythology and history by W. B. Yeats. The Irish poet has asserted a significant influence on Thumboo, as Thumboo recognizes parallels between Ireland's nationalistic struggle and Singapore's breakaway from colonialism. He describes himself as a myth-inspired poet, and sees myths as ancient narratives and structures which provide a stable point of reference for a multicultural society. Ulysses has prompted other Singaporean poets such as Alfian Sa'at, Vernon Chan, David Leo, Felix Cheong, Gwee Li Sui, Koh Buck Song, Lee Tzu Pheng, Alvin Pang and Daren Shiau to write their own Merlion-themed verses; it is often joked that one cannot be regarded as a true Singapore poet until one has written a "Merlion poem". A copy of Ulysses is installed on a plaque near the statue.

History also features strongly in Thumboo's poetry. He has said:

In August 2008, The Straits Times said that Thumboo's "most powerful legacy" was "spearheading the creation of a Singapore literature in English", although Thumboo himself downplayed his pioneering role by commenting: "There were not that many people writing in 1965, so you had the feeling that you had to create something. But you don't stand there and say, 'Look, I am a pioneer'. There is a need to do something, to help go about creating something, and you do it." He compiled and edited some of the first anthologies of English poetry from Singapore and Malaysia, including The Flowering Tree (1970), Seven Poets (1973) and The Second Tongue (1979). He was also the general editor of two multilingual anthologies sponsored by the Association of Southeast Asian Nations (ASEAN) Committee of Culture and Information entitled The Poetry of Singapore (1985) and The Fiction of Singapore (1990). In addition to the collections of poetry already mentioned, he has published two volumes of poetry for children called Child's Delight (1972), and another collection called Friend: Poems (2003). Still Travelling, an anthology consisting of almost 50 poems, was published in 2008.

On 29 October 2001, at the launch of a book entitled Ariels: Departures and Returns – Essays for Edwin Thumboo at the Singapore Art Museum, Associate Professor Robbie Goh said:

In 2015, Gods Can Die was selected by The Business Times as one of the Top 10 English Singapore books from 1965–2015, alongside titles by Goh Poh Seng and Daren Shiau.

Awards
Thumboo has won the National Book Development Council of Singapore Book Awards for Poetry three times, in 1978 for Gods Can Die (1977), in 1980 for Ulysses by the Merlion (1979), and again in 1994 for A Third Map (1993). He also received the inaugural S.E.A. Write Award in 1979, the first Cultural Medallion for Literature in 1979, and the ASEAN Cultural and Communication Award (Literature) in 1987. In October 2002, he presented the keynote address at the biennial meeting of the International Association of World Englishes at the University of Illinois at Urbana-Champaign. There, he was presented with the Raja Rao Award for his contributions to the literature of the Indian diaspora.

Thumboo was conferred a Bintang Bakti Masyarakat (Public Service Star) in 1981 with an additional Bar in 1991, and the Pingat Jasa Gemilang (Meritorious Services Medal) as Distinguished Poet and Literary Scholar in 2006.

Select bibliography
The bibliography edited by R. Ramachandran and Phan Ming Yen provides the most comprehensive listing of works by him and on him.

Poetry collections
.
.
.
.
.
.
.

Edited poetry anthologies
.
.
.
.
.  (v. 2),  (v. 2a),  (v. 3).
.
.
.

Other works
.
.
.
.
.
.
.
.
.
.
.
.

Personal life
Some of Thumboo's poems have biblical themes, reflecting the fact that he was born into a Protestant Christian family and baptized as an adult. Thumboo and his wife Yeo Swee Ching live in Bukit Panjang, a suburban area in the central northwestern part of Singapore. They have a son Julian who was the head of research at the Singapore General Hospital;  a daughter Claire, who is a physician; and seven grandchildren to whom he dedicated Still Travelling (2008).

Notes

References
.
.
.
.
.

Further reading

Articles
.
.
 Mohammad A. Quayum, "An Interview with Edwin Thumboo." Peninsular Muse: Interviews with Modern Malaysian and Singaporean Poets, Novelists and Dramatists. Oxford, UK: Peter Lang, 2007.

Bibliography
.

Books

.
.

.
.
.
.

News reports
.
.

External links

Asiatic, Vol. 7, No. 2 (http://asiatic.iium.edu.my). There are nine articles on Edwin Thumboo in this issue of the journal.
National Online Repository of the Arts Resource Guide on Edwin Thumboo

1933 births
Living people
Academic staff of the National University of Singapore
Recipients of the Bintang Bakti Masyarakat
Recipients of the Cultural Medallion for literature
Recipients of the Pingat Jasa Gemilang
S.E.A. Write Award winners
Singaporean people of Teochew descent
Singaporean non-fiction writers
Singaporean people of Chinese descent
Peranakan people in Singapore
Singaporean people of Tamil descent
Singaporean people of Indian descent
Singaporean poets
Singaporean Protestants
Victoria School, Singapore alumni
International Writing Program alumni
University of Malaya alumni